Susan Walters, is an American actress and former model, best known for her roles as Lorna Forbes on the ABC daytime soap opera Loving from 1983 to late 1986 and as Diane Jenkins on the CBS soap opera The Young and the Restless from 2001 to 2004, again briefly in 2010, and once more starting in March 2022. Walters had recurring roles as Principal Rimkus on The CW's One Tree Hill, as Carol Lockwood on The CW's The Vampire Diaries and as Natalie Martin on the MTV series Teen Wolf.

Life and career
Susan Walters was born in Atlanta, Georgia and attended Chamblee High School. She became Miss Teen All American in 1981, representing Georgia.

She began her television career playing Lorna Forbes Perelli on the soap opera Loving from the pilot on June 1983 to late 1986.  Her first role after Loving was in the 1987 film Russkies.

Aaron Spelling hired Walters for several of his productions: in Hotel during its last season (as Ryan Thomas) 1987–1988; in the 1988 television miniseries Elvis and Me as Priscilla Presley; in Nightingales (as Bridget Loring) 1988–1989; and in Melrose Place (as Tiffany Hart).

Other credits include a starring role in 1990 in Dear John, the short-lived prime time series Point Pleasant, and a guest role on CSI: Miami. In 1993, she played Lee Gilrich in an episode of Murder, She Wrote. She garnered attention for her appearances as "Mulva" (real name Dolores) on Seinfeld, which she played in 1993 and again in 1996.

Walters starred as Anne Osborne in the television version of The Big Easy on the USA Network in 1996. In 1999, she appeared in the Disney Channel movie Horse Sense, as well as its 2001 sequel, Jumping Ship. In 2000, she also portrayed the lead character opposite her husband Linden Ashby on the TV-series The War Next Door.

From 2001 through 2004, she returned to daytime soap opera when she took on the role of Diane Jenkins on The Young and the Restless.  In 2010, Walters reprised the role for two episodes.

In 2009, Walters starred in the episode "Pilot" of the first season of Drop Dead Diva alongside her husband, Linden Ashby, as a couple getting divorced. After portraying Principal Rimkus on One Tree Hill in 2009, Walters recurred in the role of Carol Lockwood on The Vampire Diaries from 2009 through 2012.

In 2014, Walters made guest star or recurring appearances on three different series: She played Maia in the CW series Star-Crossed, Lindsay in the CBS series Reckless and Natalie Martin on the MTV series Teen Wolf.  In 2015, Walters starred in season 2 episode 7 of How To Get Away With Murder.

In 2022, Walters returned to her role as Diane Jenkins at the conclusion of the March 23, 2022 episode of The Young and the Restless.

Personal life
 
Walters is married to actor Linden Ashby. They met on the set of Loving where they portrayed cousins Lorna Forbes and Curtis Alden. They often share screen on the same TV series (Loving, Spy Games, Melrose Place, The War Next Door, The Young and the Restless, Teen Wolf).

They have two daughters, Frances Grace and Savannah Elizabeth.

Filmography

Film

Television

Video games

References

External links
 
 http://www.soaps.com/youngandrestless/comings_and_goings/ 

Living people
Actresses from Atlanta
Female models from Georgia (U.S. state)
American film actresses
American soap opera actresses
American television actresses
American beauty pageant winners
20th-century American actresses
21st-century American actresses
Year of birth missing (living people)